The Light Horse Interchange is a motorway interchange located in Eastern Creek, Sydney, Australia at the junction of the M4 and M7 motorways. The interchange is the largest in the southern hemisphere and was opened to traffic in December 2005. The interchange was named in honour of the Australian Light Horse Brigades of World War I, who trained at the Wallgrove Army camp that was located near the site of the interchange prior to deploying overseas.

Design and construction

In response to a population boom in Sydney's western suburbs, the Government of New South Wales' Sydney Orbital Roads Strategy identified the need for a limited access north-south link. The Westlink M7 project would connect the three existing east-west motorways: the M5 South Western Motorway, the M4 Western Motorway and the M2 Hills Motorway catering for up to 60,000 vehicles per day and providing faster routes to the Sydney central business district. Following a request for tender in 2001, a joint venture between engineering firms Leighton Contractors and Abigroup were awarded the contract in 2003 to design and construct the Westlink M7 motorway and interchanges, including Australia's first complete four-level stack interchange.

Construction of the Light Horse Interchange began in 2003 at the site of the existing M4 Wallgrove Road exit. The new motorway overpass consisted of two spans,  and  carrying the main carriageways of the M7 over the existing M4. 802 individual bridge segments were used to create the main spans, 8 connecting ramps and a separate bridge carrying a shared pedestrian and cycle path. Due to the complexity of the interchange no access to the M7 was provided.

During the construction phase between 2003 and 2005, both the M4 Western Motorway and Wallgrove Road continued to carry traffic as normal. Upon completion, electronic tolling was implemented for vehicles entering the Westlink M7, allowing continuous flow of traffic.

Landscaping
As a major feature of Sydney's road network, the Light Horse Interchange features unique landscaping and lighting. The tower, resembling a torch, serves as the centrepiece of the Light Horse Sculpture Parade, designed with the support of the Returned & Services League of Australia. The median strip of both the M4 and M7 motorways approaching the interchange are lined with markers which represent the Light Horse on parade. Each marker is painted red to symbolise the Flanders poppy, as well as the blood of supreme sacrifice, with white bands to represent the innocence of the soldiers leaving for war. Wire plumages atop the markers represent the emu feathers worn in the slouch hats of members of the regiment. As quarantine laws prevented the horses from returning to Australia after combat, there is no reference to horses in the sculpture.

References

Military memorials in New South Wales
Road interchanges in Australia
Transport infrastructure completed in 2005
2005 establishments in Australia